Jan Jesenius, also written as Jessenius (December 27, 1566 – June 21, 1621), was a Bohemian physician, politician and philosopher.

Life

Early years
He was from an old noble family, the House of Jeszenszky, originally from the Kingdom of Hungary. He presented himself in his own works as eques Ungarus ("Hungarian knight"). According to scholar publications, he had Slovak, Polish or German roots. His father, Boldizsár Jeszenszky de Nagyjeszen, left Turóc County (today the  Turiec region in Slovakia) because of the Ottomans' military campaign against Upper Hungary and settled down in Silesia in 1555. He married Marta Schülerin, who came from a wealthy German bourgeois family.

Jesenius was born in Breslau (Wrocław), where he studied at the Elisabeth gymnasium. From 1583 he studied at the University of Wittenberg, from 1585 at the University of Leipzig, and from 1588 at the University of Padua.

Professional achievements 
His most important philosophical work was Zoroaster (1593), a work of universal philosophy which attempted to recover the lost wisdom of the ancients.

From 1593 Jesenius was the physician of the Prince of Saxony, and from 1594 professor of anatomy at the University of Wittenberg. After 1600 he settled down in Prague as professor and anatomical consultant for Rudolf II, King of Bohemia and Holy Roman Emperor.

In 1600 he attracted considerable public interest by performing a public autopsy in Prague. (His notes on the autopsy were published in 2005 by Karolinum, a publishing house of  Charles University of Prague.)

In 1617 he was elected rector of Charles University of Prague.

Political career 
He was also a diplomat and orator, and after the dethroning of Habsburgs in the Crown of Bohemia, he took several diplomatic missions for Bohemian estates and for the newly elected king Frederick of the Palatinate.

In 1618, Jesenius was arrested in Pressburg (Bratislava) after being sent as a deputy by the Bohemian estates, and was held in a prison of Vienna. In December, he was released in exchange for two Habsburg captives. There is a legend that, before his release, he wrote the inscription IMMMM on the wall of his prison cell. Ferdinand explained this as Imperator Mathias Mense Martio Morietur (Latin for "Emperor Mathias will die in the month of March"), and he wrote another prophecy next to it: Iesseni, Mentiris, Mala Morte Morieris ("Jesenius, you lie, you will die a horrible death").

Both predictions came true: Emperor Mathias died in March 1619, and Jesenius was arrested after the defeat of King Frederick of Bohemia by Emperor Ferdinand II in 1620 (Battle of White Mountain) and executed, along with 26 other Bohemian estates leaders, on the Old Town Square in 1621.

See also 
 Bohemian Revolt

Notes

References 
 : Doktor Jesenius, Szlovákiai Szépirodalmi Könyvkiadó-Móra Ferenc Könyvkiadó, Bratislava(Pozsony)-Budapest, 1958. 
 Ľudo Zúbek: Doktor Jesenius, Móra Ferenc Könyvkiadó, Budapest, 1966. 
 Ruttkay László: Jeszenszky (Jessenius) János és kora 1566-1621, Semmelweis Orvostörténeti Múzeum és Könyvtár, Budapest, 1971. 

1566 births
1621 deaths
16th-century Bohemian people
17th-century Bohemian people
17th-century Bohemian physicians
Hungarian scientists
Czech philosophers¨
Executed Slovak people
Academic staff of Charles University
Leipzig University alumni
Expatriates in the Czech lands
People from Austrian Silesia
Physicians from Wrocław
Jeszenszky family
University of Padua alumni